Mattie Parker (born November 9, 1983) is an American attorney, business owner and politician serving as the 45th Mayor of Fort Worth, Texas. She was elected in 2021 after serving as Chief of Staff for the Mayor and the Fort Worth City Council for five years. She is one of the youngest mayors of a major American city in U.S. history. After coming in second place in the first round of voting in May, Parker faced off against Deborah Peoples, the Tarrant County Democratic Party chair, in the run-off election on June 5, 2021. Parker received 53.5% of the vote in the nominally non-partisan election.

In Fort Worth, mayors are elected to two-year terms. Parker succeeded Betsy Price, who was elected to five consecutive terms as mayor, including the 2019 election, in which Price also defeated Peoples. Price opted to not run for a sixth term in 2021 and endorsed Parker, her former chief of staff. Before serving as the chief of staff for her predecessor Betsy Price, she was on the Fort Worth city council from 2015 until 2020.

Early life and education 
Parker was born Mattie Jean Pearcy in Hico, Texas, about 80 miles southwest of Fort Worth. She graduated from Hico High School in 2002 before heading to the University of Texas at Austin, where she graduated in 2006 with a Bachelor's of Arts in government. In 2012, Parker graduated from the Texas Wesleyan School of Law with a Juris Doctor degree and, in 2013, was admitted to the State Bar of Texas. Parker was in Texas Wesleyan's final graduating class before the law school was sold and became the Texas A&M University School of Law in 2013. As a law student, she was awarded the prestigious MacLean & Boulware Endowed Law Scholarship.

Family 
Mattie Parker is a wife and mother. She is married to David Parker who she had three children with, two sons and one daughter. Her husband David Parker works as a registered lobbyist and director at North Texas Governmental Affairs Operations.

Career 
During her junior year at the University of Texas, Parker became a press assistant in then-Texas House of Representatives Speaker Tom Craddick's office. She later became Craddick's deputy press secretary and served as his executive assistant after graduating from college. Between 2007 and 2010, Parker worked as legislative director and chief of staff to Texas Rep. Phil King, a Republican from Weatherford. While attending law school, Parker served as campaign manager for U.S. Rep Kay Granger, the first Republican woman to represent Texas in the U.S. House and Fort Worth's first female mayor. In 2012, she became Granger's district director before leaving in 2014 to work as an associate attorney at Harris, Finley & Bogle, P.C.

Parker was appointed Chief of Staff for Fort Worth's mayor and held a position on the city council in 2015, where she remained until April 2020. Parker then became the founding chief executive officer of Fort Worth Cradle to Career, a nonprofit organization, and the Tarrant To & Through (T3) Partnership, a coalition of organizations focused on increasing the number of Tarrant County students who obtain a postsecondary credential before entering the workforce. She left the position in July 2021 following her victory in the mayor's race, but remains on the board of directors.

Mayoral campaign 
In January 2021, shortly after Price announced her decision not to run for another term, Parker went public with her campaign for mayor. She received endorsements from the previous mayor of Fort Worth, Betsy Price and other prominent members of Fort Worth's business and philanthropic communities, including billionaire Sid Bass.

During Parkers' mayoral campaign she chose to follow the footsteps of the former mayor and her prior boss, Betsy Price, to uphold a nonpartisan campaign even though she has a long history with the Republican Party.

In the general election on May 1, Parker earned 30.82% of the vote and a combined total of 55% with a few of the other Republican candidates in the race. This put her behind, finishing second to Deborah Peoples, the outgoing Tarrant County Democratic Party chair who had 34% of votes. The two candidates competed in a June 5 runoff election, which attracted the highest early voter turnout in a Fort Worth mayor's race in at least a decade. In addition to attracting many young voters, this mayoral race grabbed the attention of many major leaders and representatives across Texas as this was one of few large cities with Republican representation in the mayoral position.

Prior to Election Day, Parker received an endorsement from Texas Gov. Greg Abbott. Parker obtained many more endorsements from political leaders and managed to obtain support from a few Democratic representatives like U.S. Representative Pete Geren. Parker won the runoff with 53.5%, becoming Fort Worth's first millennial mayor and the youngest mayor among the 25 largest cities in the U.S. Parker raised and spent more than $1.98 million during the general election and runoff, a figure that surpassed any previous expenditures in Fort Worth mayoral races. She was sworn in alongside four new city council members on June 14, 2021.

Bitcoin mining 
As Mayor of Fort Worth, Parker in association with the Texas Blockchain Council, became the first city in the U.S. to mine bitcoin.

“The Texas Blockchain Council is thrilled to be part of this first-of-its-kind pilot program as the City of Fort Worth begins mining Bitcoin. By starting small to learn as they go, Fort Worth is positioning itself to be the bitcoin mining capital of Texas. The state as a whole has already established itself as the bitcoin mining capital of the world,” said President and Founder of Texas Blockchain Council Lee Bratcher. “We are grateful for the support of several of our member companies, specifically, Luxor Technologies and Rhodium Enterprises, as they provided strategic guidance for this project.”

Education policy and development 
Mattie Parker, a mother herself, made it clear education and school reform was a priority for her term as mayor of Fort Worth. She claims that not all students have an equitable chance at a quality education in Fort Worth. In the twelve school districts that service Fort Worth, Parker's "number one priority" is that every student has an equal chance at success. She has contributed to education nonprofits and aided in the hiring of a new Fort Worth IDS Schools Superintendent.

During her time in office she has also secured the federal allocation of $400 million of the Central City Flood Control Project. A renovation lead by the federal government to help prevent flooding in downtown Fort Worth.

She also aided in "Techstars' investment accelerator, expansion of the Texas A&M law school into downtown and the announcement of a new medical school campus in Fort Worth’s medical district."

References

21st-century American politicians
21st-century American women politicians
Living people
Mayors of Fort Worth, Texas
Texas Republicans
University of Texas at Austin alumni
Women mayors of places in Texas
1983 births